Mother Knows Best is a 1928 American film directed by John G. Blystone, based on a novel by Edna Ferber, fictionalizing the life of vaudevillian Elsie Janis. The film was Fox's first part talkie, using the Movietone sound system which had primarily been used for synchronised music scores and effects tracks in Fox features beforehand, although as early as "Mother Machree" (1928), a single synchronous singing sequence was included in the film. The sound sections in Mother Knows Best were directed by actor Charles Judels, whilst the silent sequences were directed by John G. Blystone. The film starred Madge Bellamy, with Louise Dresser as her domineering mother, Barry Norton, and Albert Gran.

Cast
Madge Bellamy – Sally Quail
Louise Dresser – Ma Quail
Barry Norton – Boy
Albert Gran – Sam Kingston
Alyce McCormick – Bessie (*as Joy Auburn)
Annette De Kirby – Bessie, as a child
Stuart Erwin – Ben
Ivor De Kirby – Ben, as a child
Lucien Littlefield – Pa Quail

Unbilled 
Anne Shirley  – Sally, as a child (*as Dawn O'Day)
Billy Schuler

See also
1937 Fox vault fire

References

External links

1928 films
Fox Film films
Films directed by John G. Blystone
Lost American films
American romantic drama films
American black-and-white films
Films based on works by Edna Ferber
Early sound films
1928 romantic drama films
1920s American films
Silent romantic drama films